MGU is Moscow State University ( Moskovskiy gosudarstvenn'y universitet imeni M. V. Lomonosova).

MGU may also refer to:

 Mahatma Gandhi University, Kerala
 Manufacturing Grocers' Employees' Federation of Australia
 Most general unifier, in computer science